James Baxter (8 June 1870 – 5 July 1940) was an English rugby union player and manager.

Baxter was also a crew member of the British boat Mouchette, which won a silver medal at the 1908 Summer Olympics for sailing in the 12-metre class.

In 1927, he was president of the Rugby Football Union and managed the British and Irish Lions tour to Argentina in 1927 and the 1930 tour to New Zealand and Australia.

References

External links
 
 

1870 births
1940 deaths
English rugby union players
English male sailors (sport)
British male sailors (sport)
Sailors at the 1908 Summer Olympics – 12 Metre
Olympic sailors of Great Britain
Olympic silver medallists for Great Britain
England international rugby union players
Olympic medalists in sailing
Birkenhead Park FC players
Medalists at the 1908 Summer Olympics
Rugby union players from Birkenhead
Rugby union forwards